The Tete veld aethomys or Tete veld rat (Aethomys ineptus) is a species of rodent in the family Muridae.
It is found in South Africa and Eswatini. Its natural habitats are temperate forests, shrubland, and grassland. The common name refers to the type locality, Tete, on the Zambesi River.

Description
The fur is reddish-brown over most of the body, but ticked with blackish hairs, giving an overall shade varying from brown to cinnamon. The underparts are white or very pale grey, with the fur being sharply demarcated from that on the rest of the body.

Tete veld rats are physically indistinguishable from the closely related red rock rats, and were thought to represent a subspecies of the latter until as recently as 1998. In that year, genetic analysis revealed that the two species were distinct, making the Tete veld rat an example of a cryptic species. Other than analysis of chromosomes or mitochondrial DNA, the two species can only be reliably distinguished by the shape of their spermatozoa, which have an unusual spatulated shape in Tete veld rats.

Distribution and habitat
Because of the extreme physical similarity between Tete veld rats and red rock rats, the exact range of the latter is unclear, and some areas may exist where both species are found together. However, the current best estimate suggests that Tete veld rats are found in Eswatini and northeastern South Africa, where they are found in the North West, Limpopo, Mpumalanga, Gauteng, and KwaZulu-Natal provinces, and the northern part of Free State province. They may also be found in some neighbouring regions of Mozambique and Botswana, although this has yet to be confirmed. They prefer environments with substantial cover, whether from low-lying vegetation or rocky outcrops.

Although up to eight subspecies have previously been recognised, some evidence indicates a gradual clinal change in physical features with latitude, meaning these subspecies may not be distinct and that the Tete veld rat is monotypic.

Biology and behaviour
Tete veld rats are nocturnal and primarily herbivorous, feeding on a mix of vegetation, especially including seeds, although insects form up to 9% of their diet. It has been reported to be semi-arboreal in habits.

The rats breed in the summer and autumn, and may give birth to up to two litters a year. Litters consist of up to three young. Based on the relatively small size of the male's testes, they have been suggested to be monogamous, with little competition between males.

References

Aethomys
Mammals described in 1908
Taxa named by Oldfield Thomas
Taxonomy articles created by Polbot